The Hsinchu Performing Arts Center is an art center in North District, Hsinchu City, Taiwan.

History
The center was originally established as the Hsinchu City Performance Hall. It was then placed under the Performing Arts Section of the Bureau of Cultural Affairs of Hsinchu City Government since 1 July 2004.

Notable events
 48th Golden Horse Awards

Transportation
The center is accessible within walking distance north of Hsinchu Station of Taiwan Railways.

See also
 List of tourist attractions in Taiwan

References

Buildings and structures in Hsinchu
Performing arts centers in Taiwan